Far East National Bank (FENB) was founded in 1974 by Henry Y. Hwang as the first federally chartered Asian American bank in the United States. FENB has over 600 employees and total assets exceeding US$1.7 billion.  It became a wholly owned subsidiary of Taiwan's Bank Sinopac in 1997.  Services are provided through nine branches throughout the Los Angeles and San Francisco areas.  The bank opened its first overseas branch in Ho Chi Minh City, Vietnam, in October 2004.  The corporate headquarters is at Chinatown Los Angeles.

In 2017 the bank merged with Cathay Bank.

Trivia 

 Henry Y. Hwang, the founder of Far East National Bank, is the father of Tony Award winning playwright David Henry Hwang, and appears as a major character in David's play Yellow Face (play)

References

External links
 Far East National Bank Homepage

Banks based in California
Companies based in Los Angeles
Banks established in 1974
2017 mergers and acquisitions
Asian-American culture in California
Defunct banks of the United States